{{safesubst:#invoke:RfD||2=Pithius|month = February
|day = 27
|year = 2023
|time = 15:34
|timestamp = 20230227153411

|content=
REDIRECT Classification of demons#CITEREFAgrippa1510

}}